Gustavo Machado da Silva (born May 17, 1975) is a Brazilian professional mixed martial artist who has competed for the International Fight League, Shooto, DEEP, RINGS, Pancrase and King of the Cage promotions. Machado was also briefly a member of the IFL New York Pitbulls.

Mixed martial arts record

|-
| Loss
| align=center| 23–10–1
| Rafael Carvalho
| Decision (unanimous)
| Smash Fight 2
| 
| align=center| 3
| align=center| 5:00
| Curitiba, Parana, Brazil
| 
|-
| Win
| align=center| 23–9–1
| Ricardo Scrippe de Oliveira
| Submission (heel hook)
| Watch Out Combat Show 21
| 
| align=center| 1
| align=center| 3:09
| Rio de Janeiro, Brazil
| 
|-
| Loss
| align=center| 22–9–1
| Patrick Côté
| KO (punches)
| Amazon Forest Combat 2
| 
| align=center| 1
| align=center| 2:44
| Manaus, Brazil
| 
|-
| Win
| align=center| 22–8–1
| Henrique Oliveira
| Decision (unanimous)
| MMAAD: MMA Against Dengue
| 
| align=center| 3
| align=center| 5:00
| Rio de Janeiro, Brazil
| 
|-
| Win
| align=center| 21–8–1
| Andres Osorio
| Submission (guillotine choke)
| X-Combat Ultra MMA: International Grand Prix
| 
| align=center| 2
| align=center| 1:02
| Rio de Janeiro, Brazil
| 
|-
| Win
| align=center| 20–8–1
| Matias Lemon
| TKO (punches)
| Fatality Arena: 2nd Edition
| 
| align=center| 2
| align=center| 1:33
| Niterói, Brazil
| 
|-
| Win
| align=center| 19–8–1
| Rick Reeves
| Decision (split)
| Powerhouse World Promotions: War on the Mainland
| 
| align=center| 3
| align=center| 5:00
| Irvine, California, United States
| 
|-
| Loss
| align=center| 18–8–1
| Jordan Smith
| Decision (unanimous)
| Washington Combat: Battle of the Legends
| 
| align=center| 3
| align=center| 5:00
| Washington, D.C., District of Columbia
| 
|-
| Win
| align=center| 18–7–1
| Rico Washington Sr.
| Decision (unanimous)
| Bitetti Combat MMA 5
| 
| align=center| 3
| align=center| 5:00
| Barueri, Brazil
| 
|-
| Win
| align=center| 17–7–1
| Matias Lemon
| TKO (punches)
| X-Combat Ultra MMA
| 
| align=center| 1
| align=center| 2:50
| Espirito Santo, Brazil
| 
|-
| Win
| align=center| 16–7–1
| Jorge Bezerra
| Decision (unanimous)
| World Fighting Combat
| 
| align=center| 3
| align=center| 5:00
| Niterói, Brazil
| 
|-
| Win
| align=center| 15–7–1
| Pedro Paulo
| TKO (corner stoppage)
| Shooto: Brazil 10
| 
| align=center| 2
| align=center| 5:00
| Rio de Janeiro, Brazil
| 
|-
| Win
| align=center| 14–7–1
| Alfonso Garate
| Submission (heel hook)
| TG: The Glory
| 
| align=center| 2
| align=center| 3:45
| Amazonas, Brazil
| 
|-
| Win
| align=center| 13–7–1
| John Cronk
| Decision (unanimous)
| PCF 1: HellRazor
| 
| align=center| 3
| align=center| 5:00
| Denver, Colorado, United States
| 
|-
| Loss
| align=center| 12–7–1
| Jorge Patino
| Decision (split)
| Predador FC 6: Octagon
| 
| align=center| 3
| align=center| 5:00
| São Paulo, Brazil
| 
|-
| Loss
| align=center| 12–6–1
| Demian Maia
| Decision (unanimous)
| Super Challenge 1
| 
| align=center| 2
| align=center| 5:00
| São Paulo, Brazil
| 
|-
| Win
| align=center| 12–5–1
| Leonardo Lucio Nascimento
| Decision (unanimous)
| Super Challenge 1
| 
| align=center| 2
| align=center| 5:00
| São Paulo, Brazil
| 
|-
| Win
| align=center| 11–5–1
| Marcelo Brito
| Decision (split)
| Storm Samurai 11
| 
| align=center| 3
| align=center| 5:00
| Curitiba, Brazil
| 
|-
| Loss
| align=center| 10-5-1
| Brad Blackburn
| Decision (split)
| IFL: Legends Championship 2006
| 
| align=center| 3
| align=center| 4:00
| Atlantic City, New Jersey, United States
| 
|-
| Loss
| align=center| 10–4–1
| Mike Pyle
| TKO (punches)
| GFC: Team Gracie vs. Team Hammer House
| 
| align=center| 1
| align=center| 1:20
| Columbus, Ohio, United States
| 
|-
| Loss
| align=center| 10–3–1
| Thales Leites
| Submission (arm-triangle choke)
| SS 8: Storm Samurai 8
| 
| align=center| 3
| align=center| N/A
| Brasília, Brazil
| 
|-
| Win
| align=center| 10–2–1
| Yuki Sasaki
| Decision (majority)
| Pancrase: Spiral 2
| 
| align=center| 3
| align=center| 5:00
| Yokohama, Japan
| 
|-
| Win
| align=center| 9–2–1
| Keiichiro Yamamiya
| Submission (heel hook)
| Pancrase: Brave 11
| 
| align=center| 3
| align=center| 1:20
| Tokyo, Japan
| 
|-
| Win
| align=center| 8–2–1
| Nilson de Castro
| Decision (majority)
| Meca 11: Meca World Vale Tudo 11
| 
| align=center| 3
| align=center| 5:00
| Rio de Janeiro, Brazil
| 
|-
| Win
| align=center| 7–2–1
| Allan Goes
| TKO (retirement)
| Heat FC 2: Evolution
| 
| align=center| 1
| align=center| 5:00
| Natal, Rio Grande do Norte, Brazil
| 
|-
| Loss
| align=center| 6–2–1
| Benji Radach
| KO (punches)
| KOTC 28: More Punishment
| 
| align=center| 1
| align=center| 1:31
| Reno, Nevada, United States
| 
|-
| Win
| align=center| 6–1–1
| Nate Quarry
| Decision (unanimous)
| KOTC 25: Flaming Fury
| 
| align=center| 3
| align=center| 5:00
| San Jacinto, California, United States
| 
|-
| Draw
| align=center| 5–1–1
| Yuki Sasaki
| Draw
| Deep: 4th Impact
| 
| align=center| 3
| align=center| 5:00
| Nagoya, Japan
| 
|-
| Win
| align=center| 5–1
| Jorge Patino
| Submission (heel hook)
| Meca 6: Meca World Vale Tudo 6
| 
| align=center| 1
| align=center| 2:00
| Curitiba, Brazil
| 
|-
| Loss
| align=center| 4–1
| Ricardo Arona
| TKO (leg kick and punches)
| Rings: 10th Anniversary
| 
| align=center| 1
| align=center| 1:29
| Tokyo, Japan
| 
|-
| Win
| align=center| 4–0
| Chris Haseman
| Decision (unanimous)
| Rings: 10th Anniversary
| 
| align=center| 2
| align=center| 5:00
| Tokyo, Japan
| 
|-
| Win
| align=center| 3–0
| Kiyoshi Tamura
| Decision (majority)
| Rings: World Title Series 1
| 
| align=center| 2
| align=center| 5:00
| Tokyo, Japan
| 
|-
| Win
| align=center| 2–0
| Jose de Oliveira
| Decision (unanimous)
| Meca 3: Meca World Vale Tudo 3
| 
| align=center| 3
| align=center| 5:00
| Curitiba, Brazil
| 
|-
| Win
| align=center| 1–0
| Wataru Sakata
| TKO (cut)
| Rings: Battle Genesis Vol. 6
| 
| align=center| 1
| align=center| 1:35
| Tokyo, Japan
|

References

External links

Living people
Brazilian male mixed martial artists
Welterweight mixed martial artists
Mixed martial artists utilizing Brazilian jiu-jitsu
Brazilian practitioners of Brazilian jiu-jitsu
People from Vitória, Espírito Santo
1975 births
Brazilian jiu-jitsu trainers
People awarded a black belt in Brazilian jiu-jitsu
Sportspeople from Espírito Santo